Rhododon, called sandmint, is a genus of flowering plant in the family Lamiaceae, first described as a genus in 1939. It contains only one known species, Rhododon ciliatus, the Texas sandmint endemic to the state of Texas in the United States.

References

External links
US Department of Agriculture plant profile, Rhododon Epling, sandmint
Lady Bird Johnson Wildflower Center, University of Texas
Dave's Garden

Lamiaceae
Endemic flora of Texas
Monotypic Lamiaceae genera